Laura's Shoppe Inc. is a Canadian women’s wear boutique chain founded in 1930 by Laura Wolstein, the first Laura store was located on St. Hubert Street, Montreal and later moved to Verdun Avenue in Verdun, a suburb of Montreal.

Laura Canada remained a one-store operation until 1973 when Kalman Fisher, grandson of Laura Wolstein, and now President of Laura Canada, opened a second store in a small shopping centre in the Montreal suburb of St. Laurent.  A third store was opened in Place Vertu in 1975, followed by another in les Galeries d'Anjou in 1976.

Filing for creditor protection
In July 2015, Laura filed for creditor protection. According to company's filing, the chain has liabilities of more than $20 million.

References

External links

 Official website

Clothing retailers of Canada
Companies based in Montreal
1930 establishments in Quebec
Retail companies established in 1930